The Turkish Chess Federation (TSF) is the governing chess organization within Turkey. The TSF was founded in 1954, and became a member of the FIDE in 1962. The federation was integrated into the General Directorate of Youth and Sports in 1991, gaining its official nationwide recognition. As of 2012, the president of the federation is Gülkız Tulay. Having over 800,000  licensed players, TSF is the largest sports Federation in Turkey.

The TSF is also member of the European Chess Union and Mediterranean Chess Association.

Competitions
The federation organizes the following chess competitions:
 Türkiye İş Bankası Chess League
 Turkish Chess Premier League
 Turkish Chess Championship
 Turkish Women's Chess Championship
 Turkish Cadets' Chess Championship
 Turkish Children's Chess Championship
 Turkish Chess Clubs Championship

International events
 34th Chess Olympiad (October 28-November 12, 2000) in Istanbul
 Women's World Chess Championship (December 2–25, 2010) in Hatay
 World Amateur Championship (October 1-11, 2011) in Antalya
 Women's World Team Championship (December 17-28, 2011) in Mardin
 2011 European Schools Chess Championship (October 12-20, 2011) in Antalya
 40th Chess Olympiad (August 27-September 10, 2012) in Istanbul
 2012 European Individual Women's Chess Championship (March 1-14, 2012) in Gaziantep
 2013 World Junior U20 Chess Championships (September 12-27, 2013) in Kocaeli
 2013 World Team Chess Championships (November 24- December 4, 2013) in Antalya
 2015 European Schools Chess Championship (June 24-July 3, 2015) in Konya

Rating System
Turkish Chess Federation uses Ukd system.

See also
 Fédération Internationale des Échecs (FIDE)

References

External links
 

National members of the European Chess Union
Chess in Turkey
Chess
1991 establishments in Turkey
Sports organizations established in 1991
Chess organizations
1991 in chess
Organizations based in Ankara